The Abercrombie class of monitors served in the Royal Navy during the First World War.

History

The four ships in this class came about when the contracted supplier of the main armament for the Greek battleship  being built in Germany was unable to supply due to the British blockade. The company – Bethlehem Steel in the United States – instead offered to sell the four  twin gun turrets to the Royal Navy on 3 November 1914. The Royal Navy was using obsolete pre-dreadnought battleships for shore bombardment in support of the army in Belgium, and a design for a shallow-draught warship (known as "Monitors") suitable for shore-bombardment was quickly designed and built to use these turrets. The ships were laid down and launched within six months.

The ships carried a single main gun turret forward of a tripod mast, which was itself in front of a single funnel. A secondary armament of two 12-pounder (76 mm) guns was fitted, with a single 3-pounder (47 mm) anti-aircraft gun and a 2-pounder pom-pom completed the ships armament.

The monitors had a box-like hull, with very bluff bow and stern, and were fitted with anti-torpedo bulges. The rushed design, however, meant that the ships were much slower than expected  — Raglans engines gave  but the ship could only reach .

During the planning and build, they were to be the Styx-class named after four American figures; General Ulysses S. Grant, General Robert E. Lee, Admiral David Farragut and General Stonewall Jackson and they were launched under these names. Because the United States was still a neutral power at that time, using these names would have been undiplomatic and so they were renamed as simply M1 through M4 before completion, then receiving their final names.

The design included a seaplane for spotting the guns, but it was found that land-based aircraft were more effective; as monitors, they would never operate in the open sea, and storing the seaplane on top of the turret meant it had to be removed to avoid damage, even if not required before the guns could fire.

Ships

References

Bibliography

  Vol. 1 • Vol. 2

Dittmar, F. J. & Colledge, J. J., "British Warships 1914-1919", (Ian Allan, London, 1972), 

 
Gray, Randal (ed), "Conway's All the World's Fighting Ships 1906–1921", (Conway Maritime Press, London, 1985), 

Monitor classes